Campo Bom is a town located in the valley of the Sinos River, in the State of Rio Grande do Sul, Brazil.

The city has a diversified industrial economy, including automotive, metallurgical, chemical and pottery industries. Due to its initial development to the footwear sector it is known, along with its neighbour Novo Hamburgo, as the "shoemaking capital". The town exports to several countries, including China, Germany and the United States.

It is one of the most developed cities throughout the State of Rio Grande do Sul. Education, health, leisure and quality of life in the city are references in the Country. The town also has free Internet available to 100% of the population and the first dedicated bicycle path in South America built in 1977 having now 7.200 metres in total.

Its population in 2020 was 69,458 inhabitants.

Clube 15 de Novembro is the football (soccer) club of the city.

History

The colonisation of the town started in 1825 with German immigrants who settled in the town centre. Initially, agriculture was the only economic activity. Afterwards landmarks such as the Deuner Mill started being built and also brought more economic activity to the town. More recently the Shoemaking Industry and commerce have been the main contributors to the town's economic success. The emancipation of Campo Bom happened in 31-Jan-1959.

See also
Vale do Sinos Technology Park, VALETEC Park

References

External links
 http://www.campobom.rs.gov.br/
 http://www.clube15denovembro.com.br/

Municipalities in Rio Grande do Sul
1829 establishments in Brazil